These are tables of congressional delegations from the state of Washington to the United States Senate and United States House of Representatives.

The current dean of the Washington delegation is Senator Patty Murray, having served in the Senate since 1993.

United States Senate

U.S. House of Representatives

Current members
This is a list of members of the current Washington delegation in the U.S. House, along with their respective tenures in office, district boundaries, and district political ratings according to the CPVI. The delegation has a total of 10 members, including 8 Democrats and 2 Republicans.

Delegates from Washington Territory

Members from Washington State

1889–1913 
From 1889 to 1909, members were elected at-large statewide.

1913–1933

1933–1953

1953–1993

1993–present

Key

See also

List of United States congressional districts
Washington's congressional districts 
Political party strength in Washington (state)

References

Politics of Washington (state)
Washington
 
 
Congressional Delegations